Joseph Golding was an Irish footballer who played as an outside right.

Born in Dublin, he joined Shamrock Rovers in 1926 from Brideville and stayed for a decade.

His first game was the official opening of Glenmalure Park on 19 September 1926 against Belfast Celtic and was part of the team that went unbeaten in 1926/27.

He won two caps for the Irish Free State in two away friendlies against Belgium. His debut came at Liège on 12 February 1928 in a 4–2 victory. His last cap was on 11 May 1930 at Astrid Park in a 3–1 win.

Golding earned two League of Ireland XI caps in 1929 and 1930 and scored a total of 20 league goals at while at Milltown.

Honours
Shamrock Rovers
 League of Ireland: 1926–27, 1931–32
 FAI Cup: 1929, 1930, 1931,
 League of Ireland Shield: 1926–27, 1931–32, 1932–33, 1934–35
 Leinster Senior Cup: 1927, 1929, 1930, 1933

References

Sources
The Hoops by Paul Doolan and Robert Goggins

Year of birth missing
Year of death missing
Association footballers from County Dublin
Republic of Ireland association footballers
Irish Free State association footballers
Association football forwards
Irish Free State international footballers
League of Ireland players
League of Ireland XI players
Shamrock Rovers F.C. players